U.S. Route 31 (US 31) in Alabama runs north–south up through the heart of Alabama for . US 31 proper begins at a junction with US 90 and US 98 in Spanish Fort and exits the state into Tennessee running concurrently with Interstate 65 (I-65) near Ardmore. US 31 enters the limits of major cities Montgomery, Birmingham, and Decatur. Throughout the state, with the exception of its concurrency with I-65 north of Athens, US 31 runs concurrently with the unsigned State Route 3 (SR 3). Today, aside from portions through major towns and cities, US 31 is largely a rural two-lane highway. The route has largely been supplanted by I-65, with which it has eight junctions and two concurrencies.

Route description
As with several other U.S. Routes in Alabama, U.S. Route 31 is mostly parallel to Interstate 65 throughout its journey across the state, servicing several towns and cities Interstate 65 bypasses.

Upon leaving US Route 90 and US Route 98 in Spanish Fort, the route heads due east towards the town of Stapleton, where it joins Alabama State Route 59 (Gulf Shores Parkway). About eleven miles later, the route leaves the Gulf Shores Parkway right-of-way and follows a town square around the Baldwin County Courthouse in Bay Minette. Leaving Bay Minette, the route winds northeast, passing fairly close to the northwestern corner of Florida. Upon crossing into Escambia County, the route winds east through Atmore before dipping south into Flomaton. Several hundred feet from the state line with Florida, the route gains U.S. Route 29, which joins it in a fifteen-mile concurrency northeast to Brewton. After losing U.S. 29 in Brewton, the route heads directly north, crossing the county line into Conecuh County. A few miles later, the route turns to be parallel with Interstate 65.

Reaching U.S. Route 84 just east of Interstate 65, U.S. Routes 31/84 travel into Evergreen, deviating from I-65. East of Evergreen, U.S. Route 84 heads southeast towards Andalusia, while U.S. Route 31 winds back north into Butler County. In far southeastern Butler County, the route engages in a fairly short concurrency with Alabama State Route 55. From the end of this concurrency in Georgiana north to Tennessee and beyond, U.S. 31 roughly parallels I-65. Heading northeast, U.S. 31 passes through Greenville. After cutting a corner of Lowndes County, U.S. 31 enters Montgomery County and crosses over I-65 for the first time.

After crossing U.S. Route 80 - which follows the historic Selma to Montgomery March Corridor - the route turns onto a beltway routing around western Montgomery, the capital of Alabama. At this point, it passes within a few miles of its child routes U.S. Route 331 and U.S. Route 231. After crossing the Alabama River, the route cuts a corner of Elmore County and enters Autauga County. In Prattville, the route has its junction with U.S. Route 82. It crosses Interstate 65 again a few miles later, quickly entering into Chilton County.

The route reaches its next concurrency with Alabama State Route 22, which it carries across Interstate 65 and into downtown Clanton, the geographical center of Alabama. After leaving SR-22, it heads north into Shelby County. After Calera, the route crosses I-65, serving Saginaw. It yet again crosses I-65 into the town of Alabaster. It enters Jefferson County a few miles later, home of Birmingham (AL).

In southern Jefferson County, the route reaches Hoover. At this point, the route crosses Interstate 459 - a partial beltway around Birmingham. In Vestavia Hills, a suburb of Birmingham, the route crosses Interstate 65 yet again, its last crossing in the county. Snaking up to Homewood, another suburb of Birmingham, the route reaches U.S. Route 280. At its interchange with U.S. 280, the route becomes the Red Mountain Expressway, descending down Red Mountain. Descending onto a viaduct above eastern Birmingham, the route has its junctions with U.S. Route 78 and U.S. Route 11 before reaching their Interstate parallels, the concurrent Interstate 20 and Interstate 59, which is also the western terminus of U.S. Route 280. At this junction, the route dips down out of the viaduct onto surface streets, passing through the northern suburbs of Birmingham. A few miles later, the route has its junction with Interstate 22; this is also a dual junction with Interstate 65, but not a crossing. At this point, the route leaves Birmingham.

Winding through Fultondale, Gardendale, Morris, and Warrior, the route serves the communities of hilly northern Jefferson County. After crossing the county line into Blount County, the route has a junction with Alabama State Route 160 immediately followed by a Parclo Interchange with Interstate 65. At this point, U.S. Route 31 enters its first concurrency with Interstate 65. A few miles later in Smoke Rise, the route leaves Interstate 65 at a trumpet interchange. Following an arc, the route winds through a ridge cut, passes through Bangor, and crosses the Mulberry Fork of the Black Warrior River into Cullman County.

Immediately entering Garden City, the route slowly starts to arc back towards I-65. In Hanceville, the route passes Wallace State University and also passes within a few miles of the Shrine of the Most Blessed Sacrament. Winding north out of Hanceville, the route crosses into the city limits of Cullman. A few miles into the city limits, the route engages in a concurrency with Alabama State Route 69. About two miles later, it reaches U.S. Route 278, which is also the end of the SR-69 concurrency. Heading north out of town, the route crosses SR-157, the University of North Alabama Highway. After descending down into Morgan County, the route yet again crosses Interstate 65. Heading north, the route passes through Hartselle before serving Decatur. Just south of the Tennessee River, the route enters its next concurrency with U.S. 72 Alt.

Crossing the Tennessee River into Limestone County, the route has a Directional-T Interchange and loses U.S. 72 Alt, heading north out of the junction. Passing by Calhoun Community College, the route heads its way to Athens (AL). At this point, it has a Parclo Interchange with U.S. Route 72. A few miles later, it returns to a concurrent state with Interstate 65, which it follows all the way to one mile above the state line with Tennessee.

Major intersections

References

 Alabama
Transportation in Baldwin County, Alabama
Transportation in Escambia County, Alabama
Transportation in Conecuh County, Alabama
Transportation in Butler County, Alabama
Transportation in Lowndes County, Alabama
Transportation in Montgomery County, Alabama
Transportation in Elmore County, Alabama
Transportation in Autauga County, Alabama
Transportation in Chilton County, Alabama
Transportation in Shelby County, Alabama
Transportation in Jefferson County, Alabama
Transportation in Blount County, Alabama
Transportation in Cullman County, Alabama
Transportation in Morgan County, Alabama
Transportation in Limestone County, Alabama
31